The Polikarpov NB (Nochnoi Bombardirovshchik—Night Bomber) was a Soviet twin-engined bomber designed during World War II. Only a single prototype had been built before the program was terminated upon the death of Nikolai Nikolaevich Polikarpov, the head of the aircraft's design bureau, in 1944.

Development
The origins of the NB program are obscure, but design work began during the winter of 1941–42 with the OKB designation of aircraft T. The NB was a high-winged, twin-engined, twin tail monoplane of mixed construction. The single-spar wing was built from a mix of steel and duralumin. The center section had a duralumin skin, but the outer panels were skinned in 'shpon'. The duralumin slotted flaps were electrically powered and ran the length of the wing center section, divided by the engine nacelles. Automatic leading edge slats were mounted on the outer panels. All control surfaces were built from wood and covered in fabric. The tailplane had 7° dihedral with twin fins. It had a duralumin structure and was covered in 'shpon'. The main gears of the conventional undercarriage retracted aft into the rear of the engine nacelles and the tail wheel retracted into the rear fuselage. Six protected fuel tanks were in the wing center section, plus four more in the outer wings. Two  air-cooled Shvetsov ASh-82 radial engines were slung underneath the wings. Alternative engines considered were the Mikulin AM-39 V-12 and the Shvetsov M-71 radial, but development problems with both engines dropped them from consideration.

The bombardier was given an extensively glazed position in the nose which also had a fixed  Berezin UB machine gun for which the pilot had a reflector sight. The dorsal gunner had a UBT machine gun in a turret while the ventral gunner fired another UB through a hatch. The bomb bay could carry up to  internally and an additional  of bombs could be carried underneath the wings.

The NB made its first flight on 23 May 1944 and completed its manufacturer's flight tests in August. Its performance promised to be outstanding, but Polikarpov's death a month earlier caused his design bureau to be shut down and all his projects were terminated.

Specifications

References
Notes

Bibliography

 Gordon, Yefim. Soviet Airpower in World War 2. Hinckley, England: Midland Publishing, 2008. .
 Gunston, Bill. The Osprey Encyclopedia of Russian Aircraft 1875–1995. London: Osprey, 1995. .

External links

 NB (Т)

NB
1940s Soviet bomber aircraft
World War II Soviet medium bombers
Abandoned military aircraft projects of the Soviet Union
High-wing aircraft
Aircraft first flown in 1944
Twin piston-engined tractor aircraft